Ralf Palik (born 2 September 1990) is a German luger who has competed since 2002. At 2010–11 Luge World Cup season he placed 38th with 50 points. At 2011–12 Luge World Cup season he placed 6th with 366 points. At Winterberg in January 2012 he was second.

References

External links
  
 

1990 births
Living people
German male lugers
People from Erzgebirgskreis
Sportspeople from Saxony
21st-century German people